Cláudia Isabel Espinheira Lima (born 5 September 1996) is a Portuguese footballer who plays as a midfielder and has appeared for the Portugal women's national team.

Career
Lima has been capped for the Portugal national team, appearing for the team during the 2019 FIFA Women's World Cup qualifying cycle.

References

External links
 
 
 
 

1996 births
Living people
Footballers from Porto
Portuguese women's footballers
Portugal women's international footballers
Women's association football midfielders
Valadares Gaia F.C. (women) players
Campeonato Nacional de Futebol Feminino players
Boavista F.C. (women) players